This is a list of bridges and tunnels on the National Register of Historic Places in the U.S. territory of Guam.

References

+Guam
Bridges